Alex Bulkley is an American animation producer and film director who is the co-founder of the animation studio ShadowMachine. He also directed The Zodiac (2005), a psychological thriller he co-wrote with his brother Kelly.

Career 
Bulkley has served as a producer on ShadowMachine's projects, beginning in 2005 with Robot Chicken and Moral Orel, and won the Primetime Emmy Award for Outstanding Short Form Animated Program for Robot Chickens "Full-Assed Christmas Special" in 2010. He received two nominations for the Primetime Emmy Award for Outstanding Animated Program for the BoJack Horseman episodes "Free Churro" and "The View from Halfway Down".

As a producer on Guillermo del Toro's Pinocchio (2022), Bulkley has won the Academy Award for Best Animated Feature, and the BAFTA Award for Best Animated Film.

References

External links

Living people
American animated film producers
Primetime Emmy Award winners
Year of birth missing (living people)
Producers who won the Best Animated Feature Academy Award